Potentilla drummondii is a species of cinquefoil known by the common name Drummond's cinquefoil. It is native to North America from Alaska to California, where it grows in many types of moist habitat. It is perhaps better described as a species complex containing many intergrading subspecies that readily hybridize with other Potentilla species. The plant is variable, growing decumbent or erect, small and tufted or up to 60 centimeters tall, hairless to woolly. The leaves are divided into several leaflets, which may be cut into lobes or toothed. The inflorescence is a cyme of several flowers. Each has a small corolla of yellow petals, each petal one half to one centimeter in length.

External links
Jepson Manual Treatment
Washington Burke Museum
Photo gallery
Photo gallery: ssp. breweri

drummondii